The Apple II series (trademarked with square brackets as "Apple ][" and rendered on later models as "Apple //") is a family of home computers, one of the first highly successful mass-produced microcomputer products, designed primarily by Steve Wozniak, manufactured by Apple Computer (now Apple Inc.), and launched in 1977 with the original Apple II.

In  terms of ease of use, features, and expandability, the Apple II was a major advancement over its predecessor, the Apple I, a limited-production bare circuit board computer for electronics hobbyists. Through 1988, a number of models were introduced, with the most popular, the Apple IIe, remaining relatively unchanged into the 1990s.

A model with more advanced graphics and sound and a 16-bit processor, the Apple IIGS, was added in 1986. It remained compatible with earlier Apple II models, but the IIGS had more in common with mid-1980s systems like the Atari ST, Amiga, and Acorn Archimedes.

The Apple II was first sold on June 10, 1977. By the end of production in 1993, somewhere between five and six million Apple II series computers (including about 1.25 million Apple IIGS models) had been produced. The Apple II was one of the longest running mass-produced home computer series, with models in production for just under 17 years.

The Apple II became one of several recognizable and successful computers during the 1980s and early 1990s, although this was mainly limited to the US. It was aggressively marketed through volume discounts and manufacturing arrangements to educational institutions, which made it the first computer in widespread use in American secondary schools, displacing the early leader Commodore PET. The effort to develop educational and business software for the Apple II, including the 1979 release of the popular VisiCalc spreadsheet, made the computer especially popular with business users and families.

Despite the introduction of the Motorola 68000-based Macintosh in 1984, the Apple II series still reportedly accounted for 85% of the company's hardware sales in the first quarter of fiscal 1985. Apple continued to sell Apple II systems alongside the Macintosh until terminating the IIGS in December 1992 and the IIe in November 1993. The last II-series Apple in production, the IIe card for Macintoshes, was discontinued on October 15, 1993. The total Apple II sales of all of its models during its 16-year production run were about 6 million units, with the peak occurring in 1983 when 1 million were sold.

Hardware
All the machines in the series, except the //c, shared similar overall design elements. The plastic case was designed to look more like a home appliance than a piece of electronic equipment, and the machine could be opened without the use of tools, allowing access to the computer's internals.

The motherboard held eight expansion slots and an array of random access memory (RAM) sockets that could hold up to 48 kilobytes. Over the course of the Apple II series' life, an enormous amount of first- and third-party hardware was made available to extend the capabilities of the machine.

The //c was designed as a compact, portable unit, not intended to be disassembled, and could not use most of the expansion hardware sold for the other machines in the series.

All machines in the Apple II series had a built-in keyboard, with the exception of the IIgs which had a separate keyboard.

Apple IIs had color and high-resolution graphics modes, sound capabilities and a built-in BASIC programming language. The Apple II was targeted for the masses rather than just hobbyists and engineers, and influenced many of the microcomputers that followed it. Unlike preceding home microcomputers, it was sold as a finished consumer appliance rather than as a kit (unassembled or preassembled). The Apple II series eventually supported over 1,500 software programs. 

Apple marketed the machine as a durable product, including a 1981 ad in which an Apple II survived a fire started when a cat belonging to one early user knocked over a lamp.

Software 
The original Apple II provided an operating system in ROM along with a BASIC variant called Integer BASIC. The only form of storage available was cassette tape.

When the Disk II floppy disk drive was released in 1978, a new operating system, Apple DOS, was commissioned from Shepardson Microsystems and developed by Paul Laughton, adding support for the disk drive. The final and most popular version of this software was Apple DOS 3.3.

Apple DOS was superseded by ProDOS, which supported a hierarchical filesystem and larger storage devices. With an optional third-party Z80-based expansion card, the Apple II could boot into the CP/M operating system and run WordStar, dBase II, and other CP/M software. With the release of MousePaint in 1984 and the Apple IIGS in 1986, the platform took on the look of the Macintosh user interface, including a mouse.

Apple eventually released Applesoft BASIC, a more advanced variant of the language which users could run instead of Integer BASIC for more capabilities.

Some commercial Apple II software booted directly and did not use standard DOS disk formats. This discouraged the copying or modifying of the software on the disks, and improved loading speed.

Models

Apple II

The first Apple II computers went on sale on June 10, 1977 with a MOS Technology 6502 (later Synertek) microprocessor running at 1.023 MHz, 4 KB of RAM, an audio cassette interface for loading programs and storing data, and the Integer BASIC programming language built into the ROMs. The video controller displayed 40 columns by 24 lines of monochrome, upper-case-only (the original character set matches ASCII characters 0x20 to 0x5F) text on the screen, with NTSC composite video output suitable for display on a TV monitor, or on a regular TV set by way of a separate RF modulator. The original retail price of the computer was US$1298(with 4 KB of RAM) and US$2638 (with the maximum 48 KB of RAM). To reflect the computer's color graphics capability, the Apple logo on the casing was represented using rainbow stripes, which remained a part of Apple's corporate logo until early 1998. The earliest Apple IIs were assembled in Silicon Valley, and later in Texas; printed circuit boards were manufactured in Ireland and Singapore.

An external -inch floppy disk drive, the Disk II, attached via a controller card that plugged into one of the computer's expansion slots (usually slot 6), was used for data storage and retrieval to replace cassettes. The Disk II interface, created by Steve Wozniak, was regarded as an engineering masterpiece for its economy of electronic components.

Rather than having a dedicated sound-synthesis chip, the Apple II had a toggle circuit that could only emit a click through a built-in speaker or a line out jack; all other sounds (including two, three and, eventually, four-voice music and playback of audio samples and speech synthesis) were generated entirely by software that clicked the speaker at just the right times.

The Apple II's multiple expansion slots permitted a wide variety of third-party devices, including Apple II peripheral cards such as serial controllers, display controllers, memory boards, hard disks, networking components, and realtime clocks. There were plug-in expansion cards – such as the Z-80 SoftCard – that permitted the Apple to use the Z80 processor and run a multitude of programs developed under the CP/M operating system, including the dBase II database and the WordStar word processor. There was also a third-party 6809 card that would allow OS-9 Level One to be run. Third-party sound cards greatly improved audio capabilities, allowing simple music synthesis and text-to-speech functions. Eventually, Apple II accelerator cards were created to double or quadruple the computer's speed.

Rod Holt designed the Apple II's power supply. He employed a switched-mode power supply design, which was far smaller and generated less unwanted heat than the linear power supply some other home computers used.

The original Apple II was discontinued at the start of 1981, having been superseded by the Apple II+. By 1984, over six million machines had been sold.

Apple II Plus

The Apple II Plus, introduced in June 1979, included the Applesoft BASIC programming language in ROM. This Microsoft-authored dialect of BASIC, which was previously available as an upgrade, supported floating-point arithmetic, and became the standard BASIC dialect on the Apple II series (though it ran at a noticeably slower speed than Steve Wozniak's Integer BASIC).

Except for improved graphics and disk-booting support in the ROM, and the removal of the 2k 6502 assembler/disassembler to make room for the floating point BASIC, the II+ was otherwise identical to the original II. RAM prices fell during 1980–81 and all II+ machines came from the factory with a full 48k of memory already installed.

Apple II Europlus and J-Plus

After the success of the first Apple II in the United States, Apple expanded its market to include Europe, Australia and the Far East in 1979, with the Apple II Europlus (Europe, Australia) and the Apple II J-Plus (Japan). In these models, Apple made the necessary hardware, software and firmware changes in order to comply to standards outside of the US.

Apple IIe

The Apple II Plus was followed in 1983 by the Apple IIe, a cost-reduced yet more powerful machine that used newer chips to reduce the component count and add new features, such as the display of upper and lowercase letters and a standard 64 KB of RAM.

The IIe RAM was configured as if it were a 48 KB Apple II Plus with a language card. The machine had no slot 0, but instead had an auxiliary slot that could accept a 1 KB memory card to enable the 80-column display. This card contained only RAM; the hardware and firmware for the 80-column display was built into the Apple IIe. An "extended 80-column card" with more memory increased the machine's RAM to 128 KB.

The Apple IIe was the most popular machine in the Apple II series. It has the distinction of being the longest-lived Apple computer of all time—it was manufactured and sold with only minor changes for nearly 11 years. The IIe was the last Apple II model to be sold, and was discontinued in November 1993.

During its lifespan two variations were introduced: the Apple IIe Enhanced (four replacement chips to give it some of the features of the later model Apple IIc) and the Apple IIe Platinum (a modernized case color to match other Apple products of the era, along with the addition of a numeric keypad).

Some of the feature of the IIe were carried over from the less successful Apple III, among them the ProDOS operating system.

Apple IIc

The Apple IIc was released in April 1984, billed as a portable Apple II because it could be easily carried due to its size and carrying handle, which could be flipped down to prop the machine up into a typing position. Unlike modern portables it lacked a built-in display and battery. It was the first of three Apple II models to be made in the Snow White design language, and the only one that used its unique creamy off-white color.

The Apple IIc was the first Apple II to use the 65C02 low-power variant of the 6502 processor, and featured a built-in 5.25-inch floppy drive and 128 KB RAM, with a built-in disk controller that could control external drives, composite video (NTSC or PAL), serial interfaces for modem and printer, and a port usable by either a joystick or mouse. Unlike previous Apple II models, the IIc had no internal expansion slots at all.

Two different monochrome LCD displays were sold for use with the IIc's video expansion port, although both were short-lived due to high cost and poor legibility. The IIc had an external power supply that converted AC power to 15 V DC, though the IIc itself will accept between 12 V and 17 V DC, allowing third parties to offer battery packs and automobile power adapters that connected in place of the supplied AC adapter.

Apple IIGS

The Apple IIGS, released on September 15, 1986, is the last model in the Apple II series, and a radical departure from prior models. It uses a 16-bit microprocessor, the 65C816 operating at 2.8 MHz with 24-bit addressing, allowing expansion up to 8 MB of RAM. The graphics are significantly improved, with 4096 colors and new modes with resolutions of 320×200 and 640×400.

The Apple IIGS evolved the platform while still maintaining near-complete backward compatibility. Its Mega II chip contains the functional equivalent of an entire Apple IIe computer (sans processor). This, combined with the 65816's ability to execute 65C02 code directly, provides full support for legacy software, while also supporting 16-bit software running under a new OS.

The OS eventually included a Macintosh-like graphical Finder for managing disks and files and opening documents and applications, along with desk accessories. Later, the IIGS gained the ability to read and write Macintosh disks and, through third-party software, a multitasking Unix-like shell and TrueType font support.

The GS includes a 32-voice Ensoniq 5503 DOC sample-based sound synthesizer chip with 64 KB dedicated RAM, 256 KB (or later 1.125 MB) of standard RAM, built-in peripheral ports (switchable between IIe-style card slots and IIc-style onboard controllers for disk drives, mouse, RGB video, and serial devices) and, built-in AppleTalk networking.

Apple IIc Plus

The final Apple II model was the Apple IIc Plus introduced in 1988. It was the same size and shape as the IIc that came before it, but the 5.25-inch floppy drive had been replaced with a -inch drive, the power supply was moved inside the case, and the processor was a fast 4 MHz 65C02 processor that actually ran 8-bit Apple II software faster than the IIGS.

The IIc Plus also featured a new keyboard layout that matched the Platinum IIe and IIGS. Unlike the IIe IIc and IIGS, the IIc Plus came only in one version (American) and was not officially sold anywhere outside the US. The Apple IIc Plus ceased production in 1990, with its two-year production run being the shortest of all the Apple II computers.

Apple IIe Card

Although not an extension of the Apple II line, in 1990 the Apple IIe Card, an expansion card for the LC line of Macintosh computers, was released. Essentially a miniaturized Apple IIe computer on a card (using the Mega II chip from the Apple IIGS), it allowed the Macintosh to run 8-bit Apple IIe software through hardware emulation (although video was emulated in software and was slower at times than a IIe).

Many of the LC's built-in Macintosh peripherals could be "borrowed" by the card when in Apple II mode (i.e. extra RAM, 3.5-inch floppy, AppleTalk networking, hard disk). The IIe card could not, however, run software intended for the 16-bit Apple IIGS.

Advertising, marketing, and packaging

Mike Markkula, a retired Intel marketing manager, provided the early critical funding for Apple Computer. From 1977 to 1981, Apple used the Regis McKenna agency for its advertisements and marketing. In 1981, Chiat-Day acquired Regis McKenna's advertising operations and Apple used Chiat-Day. At Regis McKenna Advertising, the team assigned to launch the Apple II consisted of Rob Janoff, art director, Chip Schafer, copywriter and Bill Kelley, account executive. Janoff came up with the Apple logo with a bite out of it. The design was originally an olive green with matching company logotype all in lower case. Steve Jobs insisted on promoting the color capability of the Apple II by putting rainbow stripes on the Apple logo. In its letterhead and business card implementation, the rounded "a" of the logotype echoed the "bite" in the logo. This logo was developed simultaneously with an advertisement and a brochure; the latter being produced for distribution initially at the first West Coast Computer Faire.

Since the original Apple II, Apple has paid high attention to its quality of packaging, partly because of Steve Jobs' personal preferences and opinions on packaging and final product appearance. All of Apple's packaging for the Apple II series looked similar, featuring much clean white space and showing the Apple rainbow logo prominently. For several years up until the late 1980s, Apple used the Motter Tektura font for packaging, until changing to the Apple Garamond font.

Apple ran the first advertisement for the Apple II, a two-page spread ad titled "Introducing Apple II", in BYTE in July 1977. The first brochure, was entitled "Simplicity" and the copy in both the ad and brochure pioneered "demystifying" language intended to make the new idea of a home computer more "personal." The Apple II introduction ad was later run in the September 1977 issue of Scientific American.

Apple later aired eight television commercials for the Apple IIGS, emphasizing its benefits to education and students, along with some print ads.

Clones

The Apple II was frequently cloned, both in the United States and abroad, in a similar way to the IBM PC. According to some sources (see below), more than 190 different models of Apple II clones were manufactured. Most could not be legally imported into the United States. Apple sued and sought criminal charges against clone makers in more than a dozen countries.

Data storage

Cassette
Originally the Apple II used Compact Cassette tapes for program and data storage. A dedicated tape recorder along the lines of the Commodore Datasette was never produced; Apple recommended using the Panasonic RQ309 in some of its early printed documentation. The uses of common consumer cassette recorders and a standard video monitor or television set (with a third party R-F modulator) made the total cost of owning an Apple II less expensive and helped contribute to the Apple II's success.

Cassette storage may have been inexpensive, but it was also slow and unreliable. The Apple II's lack of a disk drive was "a glaring weakness" in what was otherwise intended to be a polished, professional product. Recognizing that the II needed a disk drive to be taken seriously, Apple set out to develop a disk drive and a DOS to run it. Wozniak spent the 1977 Christmas holidays designing a disk controller that reduced the number of chips used by a factor of 10 compared to existing controllers. Still lacking a DOS, and with Wozniak inexperienced in operating system design, Jobs approached Shepardson Microsystems with the project. On April 10, 1978, Apple signed a contract for $13,000 with Sheperdson to develop the DOS.

Even after disk drives made the cassette tape interfaces obsolete they were still used by enthusiasts as simple one-bit audio input-output ports. Ham radio operators used the cassette input to receive slow scan TV (single frame images). A commercial speech recognition Blackjack program was available, after some user-specific voice training it would recognize simple commands (Hit, stand). Bob Bishop's "Music Kaleidoscope" was a simple program that monitored the cassette input port and based on zero-crossings created color patterns on the screen, a predecessor to current audio visualization plug-ins for media players. Music Kaleidoscope was especially popular on projection TV sets in dance halls.

The OS Disk

Apple and many third-party developers made software available on tape at first, but after the Disk II became available in 1978, tape-based Apple II software essentially disappeared from the market. The initial price of the Disk II drive and controller was US$595, although a $100 off coupon was available through the Apple newsletter "Contact". The controller could handle two drives and a second drive (without controller) retailed for $495.

The Disk II single-sided floppy drive used 5.25-inch floppy disks; double-sided disks could be used, one side at a time, by turning them over and notching a hole for the write protect sensor. After about two years, DOS 3.3 was introduced, storing 140 KB thanks to a minor firmware change on the disk controller that allowed it to store 16 sectors per track. (This upgrade was user-installable as two PROMs on older controllers.) After the release of DOS 3.3, the user community discontinued use of  except for running legacy software. Programs that required DOS 3.2 were fairly rare; however, as DOS 3.3 was not a major architectural change aside from the number of sectors per track, a program called MUFFIN was provided with DOS 3.3 to allow users to copy files from DOS 3.2 disks to DOS 3.3 disks. It was possible for software developers to create a DOS 3.2 disk which would also boot on a system with  firmware.

Later, double-sided drives, with heads to read both sides of the disk, became available from third-party companies. (Apple only produced double-sided 5.25-inch disks for the Lisa 1 computer).

On a DOS 3.x disk, tracks 0, 1, and most of track 2 were reserved to store the operating system. (It was possible, with a special utility, to reclaim most of this space for data if a disk did not need to be bootable.) A short ROM program on the disk controller had the ability to seek to track zero which it did without regard for the read/write head's current position, resulting in the characteristic "chattering" sound of a Disk II boot, which was the read/write head hitting the rubber stop block at the end of the rail – and read and execute code from sector 0. The code contained in there would then pull in the rest of the operating system. DOS stored the disk's directory on track 17, smack in the middle of the 35-track disks, in order to reduce the average seek time to the frequently used directory track. The directory was fixed in size and could hold a maximum of 105 files. Subdirectories were not supported.

Most game publishers did not include DOS on their floppy disks, since they needed the memory it occupied more than its capabilities; instead, they often wrote their own boot loaders and read-only file systems. This also served to discourage "crackers" from snooping around in the game's copy-protection code, since the data on the disk was not in files that could be accessed easily.

Some third-party manufacturers produced floppy drives that could write 40 tracks to most 5.25-inch disks, yielding 160 KB of storage per disk, but the format did not catch on widely, and no known commercial software was published on 40-track media. Most drives, even Disk IIs, could write 36 tracks; a two byte modification to DOS to format the extra track was common.

The Apple Disk II stored 140 KB on single-sided, "single-density" floppy disks, but it was very common for Apple II users to extend the capacity of a single-sided floppy disk to 280 KB by cutting out a second write-protect notch on the side of the disk using a "disk notcher" or hole puncher and inserting the disk flipped over. Double-sided disks, with notches on both sides, were available at a higher price, but in practice the magnetic coating on the reverse of nominally single-sided disks was usually of good enough quality to be used (both sides were coated in the same way to prevent warping, although only one side was certified for use). Early on, diskette manufacturers routinely warned that this technique would damage the read/write head of the drives or wear out the disk faster, and these warnings were frequently repeated in magazines of the day. In practice, however, this method was an inexpensive way to store twice as much data for no extra cost, and was widely used for commercially released floppies as well.

Later, Apple IIs were able to use 3.5-inch disks with a total capacity of 800 KB and hard disks.  did not support these drives natively; third-party software was required, and disks larger than about 400 KB had to be split up into multiple "virtual disk volumes."

DOS 3.3 was succeeded by ProDOS, a 1983 descendant of the Apple ///'s SOS. It added support for subdirectories and volumes up to 32 MB in size. ProDOS became the  DOS of choice; AppleWorks and other newer programs required it.

Legacy

Industry impact
The Apple II series of computers had an enormous impact on the technology industry and expanded the role of microcomputers in society. The Apple II was the first personal computer many people ever saw. Its price was within the reach of many middle-class families, and a partnership with MECC helped make the Apple II popular in schools. By the end of 1980 Apple had already sold over 100,000 Apple IIs. Its popularity bootstrapped the computer game and educational software markets and began the boom in the word processor and computer printer markets. The first spreadsheet application, VisiCalc, was initially released for the Apple II, and many businesses bought them just to run VisiCalc. Its success drove IBM in part to create the IBM PC, which many businesses purchased to run spreadsheet and word processing software, at first ported from Apple II versions.

The Apple II's slots, allowing any peripheral card to take control of the bus and directly access memory, enabled an independent industry of card manufacturers who together created a flood of hardware products that let users build systems that were far more powerful and useful (at a lower cost) than any competing system, most of which were not nearly as expandable and were universally proprietary. The first peripheral card was a blank prototyping card intended for electronics enthusiasts who wanted to design their own peripherals for the Apple II.

Specialty peripherals kept the Apple II in use in industry and education environments for many years after Apple Computer stopped supporting the Apple II. Well into the 1990s every clean-room (the super-clean facility where spacecraft are prepared for flight) at the Kennedy Space Center used an Apple II to monitor the environment and air quality. Most planetariums used Apple IIs to control their projectors and other equipment.

Even the game port was unusually powerful and could be used for digital and analog input and output. The early manuals included instructions for how to build a circuit with only four commonly available components (one transistor and three resistors) and a software routine to drive a common Teletype Model 33 machine. Don Lancaster used the game I/O to drive a LaserWriter printer.

Modern use
Today, emulators for various Apple II models are available to run Apple II software on macOS, Linux, Microsoft Windows, homebrew enabled Nintendo DS and other operating systems. Numerous disk images of Apple II software are available free over the Internet for use with these emulators. AppleWin and MESS are among the best emulators compatible with most Apple II images. The MESS emulator supports recording and playing back of Apple II emulation sessions, as does Home Action Replay Page (a.k.a. HARP).

In addition, an active retrocomputing community of vintage Apple II collectors and users, continue to restore, maintain and develop hardware and software for daily use of these original computers. There is still a small annual convention, KansasFest, dedicated to the platform.

In 2017, the band 8 Bit Weapon released the world's first 100% Apple II based music album entitled, "Class Apples." The album featured dance-oriented cover versions of classical music by Bach, Beethoven, and Mozart recorded directly off the Apple II motherboard.

See also
Apple Industrial Design Group
List of publications and periodicals devoted to the Apple II
Apple II peripheral cards
Apple II graphics
List of Apple II application software
List of Apple II games
List of Apple IIGS games

References

External links

epocalc Apple II clones list
"These Pictures Of Apple's First Employees Are Absolutely Wonderful", contains a c.1977 photograph taken inside Apple of early employees Chrisann Brennan, Mark Johnson, and Robert Martinengo standing in front of a stack of Apple IIs that they had tested, assembled, and were about to ship (Business Insider, December 26, 2013).

Apple II computers
Computer-related introductions in 1977